Overprovisioning can refer to:
Allocating additional bandwidth in 
Allocation of additional storage space required to mitigate write amplification in a solid-state drive